The fuscous honeyeater (Ptilotula fusca) is a species of bird in the family Meliphagidae.
It is endemic to eastern Australia.

The fuscous honeyeater is dull grey-brown to olive-brown above with buffy-grey underparts. The bill is black and the eye-ring dark. It has a small black and yellow plume formed by the rear edge of the ear coverts.

Its natural habitat is subtropical or tropical dry forests.

The fuscous honeyeater was previously placed in the genus Lichenostomus, but was moved to Ptilotula after a molecular phylogenetic analysis, published in 2011, showed that the original genus was polyphyletic.

References

fuscous honeyeater
Birds of Queensland
Birds of New South Wales
Birds of Victoria (Australia)
Endemic birds of Australia
fuscous honeyeater
Taxonomy articles created by Polbot